RB Leipzig is a German association football club based in Leipzig, Saxony. The club was founded in 2009 by initiative of the company Red Bull GmbH—which purchased the playing rights of a fifth-tier side, SSV Markranstädt, with the intent of advancing the new club to the top-flight Bundesliga within eight years. Men's professional football is run by the spin-off organization RasenballSport Leipzig GmbH. RB Leipzig plays its home matches at the Red Bull Arena.

Having finished as runners-up in their debut season in the German top flight, RB Leipzig gained entry to continental football for the first time, specifically the 2017–18 Champions League for which Red Bull Salzburg had also qualified as Austrian champions; this raised the issue of a possible conflict of interest between the clubs due to the level of influence exerted by Red Bull over both teams and the close sporting relationship between them in various aspects. After examining the operational structures during June 2017, UEFA declared themselves satisfied under their regulations that the two clubs (particularly Salzburg) were suitably independent from the Red Bull corporation, and sufficiently distinct from one another, for both be admitted to their competitions.

In the first season following that ruling, both reached the quarter-finals of the 2017–18 Europa League but did not play each other, with RB Leipzig eliminated by Olympique de Marseille who then also knocked out Salzburg in the semi-finals. However, in the next edition of the same competition, RB Leipzig and Red Bull Salzburg were drawn together in Group B to meet competitively for the first time.

RB Leipzig is one of the first clubs in history to qualify for the Champions League so soon (eight years) after its creation. Salzburg were the victors in both fixtures between the clubs (3–2 in Germany, 1–0 in Austria) and also won all their other matches to top the group, while Leipzig failed to progress after dropping further points against Celtic and Rosenborg.

RB Leipzig suffered a very heavy defeat in the 2022–23 Champions League. They lost 7–0 to Manchester City F.C. on 14 March 2023.

Matches

Source: UEFA.com, Last updated on 14 March 2023

Notes
 2QR: Second qualifying round
 3QR: Third qualifying round
 PO : Play-off round
 KRPO : Knockout round play-offs
 R32: Round of 32
 R16: Round of 16
 QF : Quarter-finals
 SF : Semi-finals

Overall record

By competition

By club

By country

Notes

References

RB Leipzig
German football clubs in international competitions